Pungudutivu Lighthouse is a lighthouse on the island of Pungudutivu in northern Sri Lanka. The lighthouse has a square tower.

See also

 List of lighthouses in Sri Lanka

References

External links
 Sri Lanka Ports Authority 
 Lighthouses of Sri Lanka

Lighthouses in Sri Lanka
Buildings and structures in Jaffna District